A sabot (pronounced sa-BO) is a clog from France or surrounding countries such as The Netherlands, Belgium or Italy. Sabots are either whole-foot clogs or a heavy leather shoe with a wooden sole.

Sabots were considered a work shoe associated with the lower classes in the 16th to 19th centuries. During this period, the years of the Industrial Revolution, the word sabotage gained currency. An alleged etymology describes the actions of disgruntled workers who willfully damaged workplace machinery by throwing their sabots into the works (see: Luddite). In truth, sabotage is derived from the noise and clumsiness associated with the wooden sabot shoe.

During World War II, 45,000 pairs of sabot were made in Jersey during the occupation of the island from 1940–45.

Notes 

16th-century fashion
17th-century fashion
18th-century fashion
19th-century fashion
20th-century fashion
21st-century fashion
Clogs (shoes)